Raajavembaala is a 1984 Indian Malayalam film, directed and produced by K. S. Gopalakrishnan. The film stars Ratheesh, Kalaranjini, Anuradha and Balan K. Nair in the lead roles. The film has a musical score by K. J. Joy.

Cast
Ratheesh as Ratheesh
Kalaranjini as Maala
Anuradha as Neelima
Balan K. Nair as Williams
C. I. Paul as George
Kuthiravattam Pappu as Chakko
Ravi Menon
Sathyakala as Nalini
T. G. Ravi as Abdullah
Vincent as Inspector 
 Bheeman Raghu as Antony
 Sudheer as Varghese
 Ajayan
 Thikkurissy Sukumaran Nair as Priest
 Jagannatha Varma as Commissionar
 K. P. A. C. Azeez as Kangani
 Rani Padmini as Sakkeena
 Thodupuzha Vasanthi as Philomina
 Sasankan Nair
 Badar
 C.Ravi
 Sudhakaran Nair
 Sukumaran Kasargode
 Antony
 Mithun

Soundtrack
The music was composed by K. J. Joy and the lyrics were written by Chunakkara Ramankutty.

References

External links
 

1984 films
1980s Malayalam-language films